Kastrup Boldklub (Kastrup BK or KB for short) is a Danish association football club based in the suburb of Kastrup (Tårnby Municipality) on Amager. As of the 2017/18-season, the club's first senior men's team play in Denmark Series (level 4). The club was founded on 4 May 1933 as Boldklubben Funkis and changed to the current name in 1941. The senior men's football team have since 1985 primarily played their home games at Kastrup Idrætsanlæg located at Røllikevej, Kastrup next to the club house, but have previously played their matches at Tårnby Stadium during their tenure in the higher ranking leagues, and occasionally still do. Kastrup Boldklub has spent a total of 9 seasons in the highest football league in Denmark, the last in 1987. Their best result was set in the 1979 season, when the first team finished in fourth place in the top league and thus qualified for the 1980 Intertoto Cup. The club has participated in two elite superstructures, Amager United (2002–2006) and FC Amager (2008–2009) and enjoy long-standing rivalries against neighbouring clubs BK Fremad Amager and AB Tårnby (previously Tårnby Boldklub). The Tårnby-based club has fielded eight active players on the national football teams, seven youth male players for the teams of Under-17, Under-19, Under-21, Denmark national amateur football team, Denmark national B-football team, and a senior player (Adam Fogt) on the Denmark national football team, including one female player on a youth team.

Head coach history 
The person responsible for direction of the first senior team has traditionally been given the title of head coach/trainer.

Achievements

9 seasons in the Highest Danish League
5 seasons in the Second Highest Danish League
13 seasons in the Third Highest Danish League
4 seasons in the Fourth Highest Danish League

Club's honours

Domestic
 2nd Division (II)
 Winners (1): 1975
 3rd Division East (III)
 Winners (1): 1974
 Denmark Series (IV)
 Winners (1): 1969 (Group 1)
 Runners-up (1): 2015–16 (Group 1)
 Copenhagen Series (IV/V)
 Winners (6): 1954–55, 1959, 1966, 1967, 1985, 2013–14
 Runners-up (3): 1964, 1984, 2011–12
 Mellemrækken (V under KBU)
 Winners (1): 1952–53
 Triangelpokalen
 Winners (2): 1949, 1950
: Won by reserve team

References

External links
 Official website for the amateur section 

 
Football clubs in Denmark
Football clubs in Copenhagen
1933 establishments in Denmark
Association football clubs established in 1933